West of January is a fantasy novel by Dave Duncan. The book won the 1990 Prix Aurora Award (Canadian Science Fiction and Fantasy) for Best Long-Form Work in English.

Plot
The novel is set on a world called Vernier, on which the cycle of day and night lasts two hundred years. It describes the journey of discovery of Knobil, a herdsman born on the grasslands of Vernier.

References

Canadian fantasy novels
1989 Canadian novels